The 2009 SunTrust Indy Challenge was the eighth round of the 2009 IndyCar Series season and took place on June 27, 2009 at the  Richmond International Raceway, in Henrico County, Virginia.

Race

Cautions

Standings after the race 

Drivers' Championship standings

 Note: Only the top five positions are included for the standings.

References

SunTrust Indy Challenge
SunTrust Indy Challenge
SunTrust Indy Challenge
SunTrust Indy Challenge